You Can Hold Me Down is the debut album by William Tell, first released on March 13, 2007 through Universal Records and New Door Records.

Track listing
 "Jeannie" (William Tell) 3:01
 "Slipping Under (Sing Along to Your Favorite Song)" (PJ Smith, William Tell) 3:34
 "Trouble" (William Tell) 2:55
 "Fairfax (You’re Still the Same)" (William Tell) 2:49
 "Like You, Only Sweeter" (Darren Tehrani, William Tell) 3:41
 "Maybe Tonight" (William Tell, Mike Green) 3:13
 "Young at Heart" (William Tell) 2:46
 "Sounds" (William Tell, PJ Smith) 3:05
 "Just For You" (William Tell, Mike Green) 3:33
 "You Can Hold Me Down" (William Tell, Darren Tehrani) 3:23

Best Buy hidden track:
<li> "You Can Hold Me Down" (Tell, Tehrani) – 9:31
 features the hidden track "After All", beginning at about 4:30

iTunes Store bonus track:
<li> "Yesterday is Calling" (James Bourne, Smith) – 3:43

Target bonus track:
<li> "Young at Heart (Acoustic)" (Tell) – 2:46

Wal-Mart bonus tracks:
<li> "This Mess" – 3:23
<li> "Katie (Where'd You Go?)" – 3:48

Personnel
William Tell - vocals, guitars, bass
Brian Ireland - drums, percussion
Andrew McMahon - piano

References

You Can Hold Me Down (William Tell album)